Club de Balompie Junqueño is a Puerto Rican association football club from Juncos that currently plays in the Liga Puerto Rico.

History
Club de Balompie Junqueño was founded in 2004. It joined the nascent Liga Puerto Rico for the 2019/20 season which was eventually cancelled because of the COVID-19 pandemic.

Domestic history
Key

References

External links
Official Website
Official Facebook profile
Liga Puerto Rico profile
Soccerway profile

Football clubs in Puerto Rico
Association football clubs established in 2004